Events from 1937 in Sweden.

Incumbents
 Monarch – Gustaf V
 Prime Minister – Per Albin Hansson

Events 

 Founding of Saab AB
 Founding of AB Nyköpings Automobilfabrik

References

 
Sweden
Years of the 20th century in Sweden